Fredric "Fred" D. Rosen is an American attorney and business executive. He was the president and chief executive officer of Ticketmaster from 1982 to 1998.

Early life
Fredric D. Rosen grew up in New Rochelle, New York. He graduated from Clark University in Worcester, Massachusetts, in 1965. He went on to receive a Juris Doctor degree from the Brooklyn Law School in 1969, and passed the New York State Bar that year.

Career
Rosen practiced the law in New York City from 1972 to 1982.

He was an attorney of Ticketmaster before becoming the president and chief executive officer from 1982 to 1998. Rosen was chairman and chief executive officer of Stone Canyon Entertainment from 2005 to 2008. He was the co-chief executive officer of Outbox Enterprises, LLC, a legal entity comprising Outbox Technology, Cirque du Soleil, from 2011 to 2012. Founded in 2005 by Jean-Francoys Brosseau, Outbox is a white label system that allows all live entertainment venues to sell tickets directly to customers without any third party involvement. The company later partenered with the Anschutz Entertainment Group to create AXS and become a major player in the field.

Rosen was a principal until 2014. He was on the Los Angeles Sports and Entertainment Commission. In 2018, Rosen became the President and CEO of Red Carpet Entertainment and its wholly owned subsidiary Red Carpet Home Cinema LLC.

Personal life
Rosen is married to Nadine Schiff, an author and film producer. They reside in Bel Air, Los Angeles, California. He is the co-founder of the Bel Air Homeowners Alliance, a NIMBY group active in Los Angeles. He has advocated against the construction of an underground subway line to the UCLA campus. He also has two children from a prior marriage.

Rosen donated to the defense fund for Mark Ridley-Thomas, a Los Angeles politician who was undergoing on corruption charges.

References

Living people
People from Bel Air, Los Angeles
Clark University alumni
Brooklyn Law School alumni
American lawyers
Businesspeople from New Rochelle, New York
Year of birth missing (living people)
New Rochelle High School alumni